James McSherry Jr. (July 29, 1819July 13, 1869) was an American lawyer and writer.

Life

McSherry was born in Liberty Town, Frederick County, Maryland.  He graduated from Mount St. Mary's College, in Emmitsburg, Maryland, in 1838, where he studied law.  He was admitted to the bar in 1840 and began practicing in Gettysburg, Pennsylvania, but returned to Maryland in 1841. McSherry continued to practice law in Frederick, Maryland, until his death in 1869.

Works

McSherry, a strong Catholic, is best known for his "History of Maryland" (Baltimore, 1849). He was a frequent contributor to the "United States Catholic Magazine", and also wrote "Pere Jean, or the Jesuit Missionary" (1849) and "Willitoff, or the Days of James the First: a Tale" (1851), republished in German (Frankfort, 1858).

Family

McSherry was the son of James McSherry and Anne Ridgely Sappington, and the grandson of Patrick McSherry.  Patrick McSherry came from Ireland to Pennsylvania in 1745, where he settled in Adams County and raised 12 children, some of whom later moved to Maryland.

McSherry married Eliza Spurrier on September 30, 1841.  Of their five children, the oldest, James, became chief judge of the Court of Appeals of Maryland.

Footnotes

External links
Catholic Encyclopedia article

1819 births
1869 deaths
American male writers
19th-century American lawyers